Wininger is a surname. Notable people with the surname include:

Bo Wininger (1922–1967), American golfer
Salomon Wininger (1877–1968), Austrian writer

See also
Winninger